Alexander Vasilyevich Kochyev (born March 25, 1956 in Saint Petersburg) is a Russian chess Grandmaster (1977).

In the 1970s, he was one of the youngest grandmasters in the world. In 1972, he won the Soviet Union Junior Chess Championship and in 1975, became European Junior Champion. He came 12th in the USSR Chess Championship of 1977. In 1978, he won the team silver and individual gold medal playing board two for the Soviet team at the 1st World Youth U26 Team Chess Championship. In 1979, he won the Reggio Emilia chess tournament.

References

External links

1956 births
Living people
Chess grandmasters
Soviet chess players
Russian chess players